Cedar Falls may refer to:
Operation Cedar Falls, ground operation of the Vietnam War
Cedar Falls, Iowa
Cedar Falls Utilities in Cedar Falls, Iowa
Cedar Falls Community School District in Cedar Falls, Iowa
Cedar Falls Historical Society in Cedar Falls, Iowa
Cedar Falls High School in Cedar Falls, Iowa
Cedar Falls Ice House in Cedar Falls, Iowa
Cedar Falls Independent Order of Odd Fellows Temple in Cedar Falls, Iowa
Cedar Falls Township, Black Hawk County, Iowa
Waterloo – Cedar Falls metropolitan area, Iowa
Cedar Falls, North Carolina
Cedar Rock Falls, North Carolina
Cedar Falls, Washington
Cedar Falls Historic District in Washington
Cedar Falls, Wisconsin
 Cedar Falls, a waterfall in Montana
 Cedar Falls, a waterfall in the Hocking Hills State Park, Ohio